United Nations Security Council Resolution 1718 was adopted unanimously by the United Nations Security Council on October 14, 2006. The resolution, passed under Chapter VII, Article 41, of the UN Charter, imposes a series of economic and commercial sanctions on the Democratic People's Republic of Korea (the DPRK, or North Korea) in the aftermath of that nation's claimed nuclear test of October 9, 2006.

Provisions

UNSCR 1718 banned a range of imports and exports to North Korea and imposed an asset freeze and travel ban on persons involved in the country’s nuclear program.  This trade ban included “battle tanks, armoured combat vehicles, large caliber artillery systems, combat aircraft, attack helicopters, warships, missiles or missile systems.”  The resolution also prohibited imports of luxury goods to the country.
Large-scale arms, nuclear technology, and related training on nuclear weapons development were prohibited from being provided to North Korea.  All states were to cooperate in inspecting cargo suspected of trafficking nuclear, chemical, or biological weapons into the country.  In practice, not all states supported this and China, an ally of North Korea, did not inspect cargo to and from the country and continued to support the North Korean regime.
Sanctions limiting trade and instituting travel bans also were included.  Stipulations required states to freeze the assets of individuals suspected of being involved with North Korea’s nuclear program.  Special provisions were included that allowed money transfers and travel ban exemptions for humanitarian purposes to be reviewed on a case-by-case basis.

The resolution's provisions include:
North Korea must "not conduct any further nuclear test or launch of a ballistic missile", "suspend all activities related to its ballistic missile programme" and "abandon all nuclear weapons and existing nuclear programmes in a complete, verifiable and irreversible manner".
The DPRK must also "return immediately to the six-party talks without precondition".
Shipments of cargo going to and from North Korea may be stopped and inspected for weapons of mass destruction or associated items (however, there is no obligation placed on member states to perform such inspections).
A ban is placed on imports and exports of "battle tanks, armoured combat vehicles, large calibre artillery systems, combat aircraft, attack helicopters, warships, missiles or missile systems",  "related materiel including spare parts" and any other items identified by the sanctions committee.
UN member states must freeze the overseas assets of individuals and companies involved with the DPRK's weapons programmes. An international travel ban is also placed on programme employees and their families.
UN members are banned from exporting luxury goods to North Korea.

Sanctions committee

The resolution established a committee to gather more information, specify the sanctions, monitor them, and issue recommendations. Subsequently, in 2009 a Panel of Experts was established in support of this Committee.

Enforcement
While the resolution does invoke Chapter VII of the United Nations Charter which allows for enforcement, it does not provide for any use of military force to back up these demands. The UN Security Council had earlier determined to present a united front on this resolution in order to make clear to Pyongyang its condemnation of the reclusive nation's nuclear aspirations, but there remain differences of opinion about the implementation of the resolution. Both China and Russia are concerned about how cargo inspections could provoke confrontations with the North Korean Navy, and China declared after passage of the resolution that it will not perform such inspections. The United States compromised on its initial desire to block all imports of military equipment. The final vote on the sanction was delayed by the attempts to change the wording.

On 16 November 2006, under the terms of the resolution, French officials in the French territory of Mayotte in the Indian Ocean searched a North Korean ship.

North Korean reaction
North Korea's UN envoy Pak Gil Yon walked out of the chamber after saying Pyongyang "totally rejects" the "unjustifiable" resolution. 
He said it was "gangster-like" for the Security Council to have adopted a "coercive resolution" while neglecting US pressure on North Korea:  
"If the United States increases pressure on the Democratic People's Republic of Korea, the DPRK will continue to take physical countermeasures considering it as a declaration of war."

The United States ambassador to the UN at the time, John Bolton, said that it was the second time in three months that the representative of North Korea had rejected a unanimous resolution of the Security Council and walked out. (The other time was after the vote on United Nations Security Council Resolution 1695.)  He went on to add: "It is the contemporary equivalent of Nikita Khrushchev pounding his shoe on the rostrum of the General Assembly."

On October 17, 2006, North Korea said the United Nations had effectively declared war on the country when it imposed sanctions for the country's nuclear test.
The DPRK foreign ministry said North Korea wanted peace, but was not afraid of war.  A statement carried by the official Korean Central News Agency said that North Korea will "mercilessly strike" if its sovereignty is violated.

On March 25, 2021, North Korea fired two ballistic missiles into the Sea of Japan as part of ongoing testing of their intercontinental missile-launching facilities. This incited renewed discussion of United Nations Security Council Resolution 1718 after U.S President Joe Biden claimed "...U.N. resolution 1718 was violated by those particular missiles that were tested..."

See also
 2006 North Korean nuclear test
 List of United Nations Security Council Resolutions 1701 to 1800 (2006–2008)
 North Korea and weapons of mass destruction
 United Nations Security Council Resolution 1874

References

External links
 
UN video feeds of Security Council vote
Text of the Resolution at undocs.org

 UN Security Council Committee Established Pursuant to Resolution 1718 (2006) (Reports issued by the UN Panel of Experts, established to support of the Sanctions Committee in carrying out its mandate as specified in paragraph 12 of resolution 1718)

 1718
Nuclear program of North Korea
 1718
 1718
2006 in North Korea
United Nations Security Council sanctions regimes
October 2006 events
Sanctions against North Korea